This is a list of banks in Uzbekistan.

Central bank 
 Central Bank of Uzbekistan

Commercial banks 

 Share-owned by the Ministry of Finance and/or Fund for Reconstruction and Development of the Republic of Uzbekistan with the various number of shares.

References

Uzbekistan
Banks
Banks

Uzbekistan